Teniel Campbell (born 23 September 1997) is a racing cyclist from Trinidad and Tobago, who currently rides for UCI Women's WorldTeam . In 2018, she won four medals at the 2018 Central American and Caribbean Games. The next year, she won the U23 individual time trial at the Pan American Road and Track Championships. She also won both stages, the general classification, the points classification and the youth classification in the Kreiz Breizh Elites Dames.

Major results

2014
 2nd Time trial, National Junior Road Championships

2015
 National Track Championships
1st  Individual pursuit
2nd Keirin
2nd Sprint
3rd 500m time trial

2016
 National Road Championships
1st  Road race
1st  Time trial
 3rd Keirin, National Track Championships
 Arima Easter International Grand Prix
1st Keirin
3rd Sprint

2018
 Central American and Caribbean Games
1st  Road race
4th Time trial
 6th Diamond Tour
 10th GP Sofie Goos

2019
 Pan American Under-23 Road Championships
1st  Time trial
4th Road race
 1st  Overall Kreiz Breizh Elites Dames
1st  Points classification
1st  Young rider classification
1st Stages 1 & 2
 Pan American Games
2nd Road race
2nd Time trial
 2nd Overall The Princess Maha Chakri Sirindhorn's Cup Tour of Thailand
1st Stage 2
 5th Nokere Koerse voor Dames
 5th Flanders Ladies Classic - Sofie De Vuyst
 6th Chrono Champenois

2020
 3rd Vuelta a la Comunitat Valenciana Feminas
 5th Omloop van het Hageland

2021
 1st Stage 6 Tour Cycliste Féminin International de l'Ardèche

2022
Caribbean Road Championships
 Time trial
 National Road Championships
1st  Road Race
1st  Time trial

References

External links

1997 births
Living people
Trinidad and Tobago female cyclists
Pan American Games medalists in cycling
Pan American Games silver medalists for Trinidad and Tobago
Cyclists at the 2019 Pan American Games
Central American and Caribbean Games medalists in cycling
Central American and Caribbean Games gold medalists for Trinidad and Tobago
Competitors at the 2018 Central American and Caribbean Games
Medalists at the 2019 Pan American Games
Olympic cyclists of Trinidad and Tobago
Cyclists at the 2020 Summer Olympics